Dolný Harmanec is a village and municipality of the Banská Bystrica District in the Banská Bystrica Region of Slovakia. It has a population of 204 people.

History
In historical records, the village was first mentioned in 1540 (Hermans) as a mining settlement belonging to Banská Bystrica.  After on, it belonged to the Thurzo family and to rich merchants Fugger. Later on, it belonged to Banská Bystrica again.

Sights
The village is located close to the Harmanec Cave.

Villages and municipalities in Banská Bystrica District